Atriplex subspicata is a species of saltbush known by the common names saline saltbush and halberdleaf orach. It is native to much of the United States and southern Canada, where it most often grows in saline and alkaline soils.

Description 
This is an annual herb which varies in appearance, growing erect up to 150 cm (5 feet) tall, with a greenish striate stem. The greenish or reddish leaves are lance-shaped to arrowhead-shaped and may exceed 8 centimeters (3.2 inches) in length. The male and female flowers are borne in small, hard clusters.

References

External links
Jepson Manual Treatment
United States Department of Agriculture Plants Profile

subspicata
Halophytes
Flora of North America
Natural history of the Central Valley (California)
Natural history of the San Francisco Bay Area